Erdeni Batur (in modern Mongolian: Эрдэнэбаатар, Erdenebaatar; ; d. 1653) was a Choros-Oirat prince generally considered to be the founder of the Dzungar Khanate, centered in the Dzungaria region, currently in north-westernmost part of China.

Early life
Erdenebaatar was the son of Khara Khula who was taishi (in modern Mongolian:тайж, taij, meaning "nobleman") of the dominant Choros tribe and the leader of the allied Four Oirat, collectively known as "Dzungars." After the death of his father in 1634, Erdeni Batur assumed his father's position and carried on his father's objective of unifying the Oirat tribes into a formal confederation with himself as the supreme military and political ruler.

Upon becoming ruler of the Dzungars, Erdeni Batur sought to consolidate his position around the Tarbagatai Mountains, the land his people roamed. In so doing, Erdeni Batur led the Dzungars to several victorious military campaigns over the Kazakhs to his west. To the north in southern Siberia, Erdeni Batur gave Russia access to salt mines, thereby ending a 20-year conflict, in exchange for diplomatic and trade relations. The commercial ties, which remained intact throughout his rule, and the prosperity generated by such ties with Russian outposts further solidified Erdeni Batur's prestige and position among the Oirats and the leaders of the adjacent nations.

Consolidation of power
Within the Khanate, Erdenebaatar set out on an ambition campaign of empire building activities. For instance, he established a capital city called Khobak Sari south of Lake Zaisan on the Imil River, near the modern city of Tacheng, and built monasteries throughout Dzungar territory. He also promoted Buddhism to his subjects, and encouraged them to resettle to the new capital and to engage in both agriculture and small-scale manufacturing, like masonry and metal crafting.

Like his father, Erdenebaatar sought to build the Khanate's power and independence to be able to wage war against the Qing dynasty of China for control over territory. His attempts to monopolize power among the Oirat tribes, however, was only partially successful. The dissension and skirmishes, for example, compelled Güshi Khan and his brother, Kundelung Ubasha, to move a substantial part of the Khoshut-Oirat tribe from the Lake Zaisan area to the area around Qinghai Lake  – what the Chinese called Qinghai and the Tibetans called Amdo  – in 1636, where they soon would establish the Khoshut Khanate and transform Tibet into a Qing protectorate. But the unity Erdeni Batur created among the remaining Oirat tribes, viz., Choros, Dörbet and Khoit tribes, further strengthened his power and his resolve to establish the Dzungar Khanate as the preeminent power in Central Asia.

The Fifth Dalai Lama took note of the rising power and influence of the Dzungar Khanate and granted Erdeni Batur the title, "Khong Tayiji" (known in Chinese as Hong Taiji, or crown prince) for military support he provided Güshi Khan to topple the enemies of the Gelug sect. Moreover, by granting this title, the Fifth Dalai Lama had hoped to have another ally protecting and promoting his Gelug lineage above the others.

Diplomacy with Mongols
His increased stature and the wide recognition the Dzungar Khanate received as a great power among Central Asian nomads led Erdenebaatar to call for a pan-Mongolian alliance in 1640. The entente took place inside Dzungar territory at a place called Ulan Buraa, near the Tarbagatai Mountains on the border between what is now the Xinjiang province of China and Kyrgyzstan. The ruling princes of all Mongolian tribes were present at the entente, except for the Mongol tribes of Inner Mongolia, who recently joined the Qing.

One of the purposes for the entente was to form a pan-Mongol coalition against all potential external enemies, such as the Kazakhs and the newly emerging Qing state. The second yet equally important purpose was to devise a method by which disputes could be resolved short of war. To that end, a legal code was drafted, establishing a system of rules that governed the daily activities of all Mongols from the Volga River in southeastern Russia to present-day eastern Mongolia. These set of laws are called the "Great Code of the Forty and the Four" (Döchin Dörben Hoyar un Ike Tsagaza) known as the Khalkha-Oirat Law.

Decline and death
The attempt to institute a pan-Mongol coalition, however, failed. The Khalkha Mongol princes were upset that Erdeni Batur assumed the leadership role, while they still claimed that, as the direct descendants of Genghis Khan, they were the rightful leaders of the Mongols. Basically, the Khalkha Mongol princes did not want to lose their sovereignty to someone who could not make that claim, even though their power and influence was in decline, while the fortunes of the Dzungar Khanate were rising. Nonetheless, Erdeni Batur did succeed in instituting a standard code of laws and in making Buddhism the official religion throughout the Mongol realm.

After the entente, Erdenebaatar continued to consolidate his power, preparing the Dzungar Khanate for its attack upon the Qing for control over Central Asia. Upon his death in 1653, Erdeni Batur was succeeded by his third son, Sengge.

References
Bawden, Charles R. The Modern History OF Mongolia, The Praeger Asia-Africa Series, Frederick A. Praeger Publishers, New York, NY (1968).
Bergholz, Fred W. The Partition of the Steppe: The Struggle of the Russians, Manchus, and the Zunghar Mongols for Empire in Central Asia, 1619–1758: A Study in Power Politics, American University Studies, Series IX, History, Vol. 109, Peter Lang Publishing, New York, NY (1993).
Grousset, René. The Empire of the Steppes: a History of Central Asia, Rutgers University Press, New Brunswick, NJ (1970).
Haines, R Spencer. "The Physical Remains of the Zunghar Legacy in Central Eurasia: Some Notes from the Field", Paper presented at the Social and Environmental Changes on the Mongolian Plateau Workshop, Canberra, ACT, Australia (2016).
Perdue, Peter C. China Marches West: The Qing Conquest of Central Eurasia, Belknap Press of Harvard University Press, Cambridge, MA (2005).

Oirats
Dzungar Khanate
1653 deaths
17th-century Mongol rulers
Year of birth unknown
Founding monarchs